The Sanjak of Inebahti or Aynabahti (Ottoman Turkish: Sancak-i/Liva-i İnebahtı/Aynabahtı) was a second-level Ottoman province (sanjak or liva) encompassing the central parts of Continental Greece. Its name derives from its capital, Inebahti/Aynabahti, the Turkish name for Naupaktos, better known in English with its Italian name, Lepanto.

History 
The province was formed in 1499, when the Ottomans conquered Lepanto, which had been a possession of the Republic of Venice since 1407. Much of the territory allocated to the new province, however, had already been under Ottoman control, under the Sanjak of Tirhala. 

On 7 October 1571, the famous Battle of Lepanto between the fleets of the Ottoman Empire and the Holy League was fought off the coast of the town of Lepanto. The Venetians retook the town in 1687, during the Morean War, but surrendered it to Turkish control in 1699, after the Treaty of Karlowitz. Although most of the province rose in revolt upon the outbreak of the Greek War of Independence in 1821, the capital Lepanto remained in Ottoman hands until 12 March 1829, when it came under Greek control.

Administrative division 
Originally, the sanjak formed part of the Rumeli Eyalet, but after 1533 it was subordinated to the new Eyalet of the Archipelago.

According to the 17th-century geographer Hajji Khalifa, the province encompassed six kazas ("districts"): Inebahti itself, Karavari (Kravara), Abukor (Apokouros), Olendirek/Olunduruk (Lidoriki), Gölhissar (Probably Limnochori) and Kerbenesh (Karpenisi).

Early 19th-century sources report that the sanjak at the time formed part of the Morea Eyalet, and comprised again six kazas: Inebahti, Abukor, Olendirek/Olunduruk, Gölhissar, Kerbenesh and Patracik (Ypati).

References 

Sanjaks of the Ottoman Empire in Europe
Ottoman Greece
States and territories established in 1499
States and territories disestablished in the 1820s
Sanjak of Inebahti
History of Aetolia-Acarnania
History of Phocis
1499 establishments in the Ottoman Empire
1829 disestablishments in the Ottoman Empire